Ana Afonso Dias Lourenço, GCIH (born 13 April 1957) is an Angolan economist, politician and former government minister. She has served as the First Lady of Angola since September 2017 as the wife of President João Lourenço.

Early and personal life
Lourenco was born on 13 April 1957 in Luanda in Angola. She had her primary education in Primary School No. 83 in Luanda  from 1962-66. She attended Preparatory School Marta Rescue Salazar, Luanda from 1966-68. She attended General Course of High Schools and High School Dona Guiomar of Lancaster Luanda from 1968-74. She completed her Degree in Economics (Planning) in the University of Angola in Luanda from 1979-83. She completed her course on Analysis Course and Project Evaluation by African Development Bank Abidjan in Côte d'Ivoire in 1984 and a course on Macroeconomic Policy Management Institute World Bank Economic development (IDE), in Portugal during 1992. Lourenco completed her graduation from the University of Agostinho Neto in Angola and also has a certificate in Macroeconomic Policy and Management.

Lourenço is multilingual: in addition to Portuguese, she speaks English, French and Spanish. She is the mother of six children.

Career
She served in various capacities as the President of the National Council of Statistics, President of SADC's National Commission, National Coordinator of the FED Fund, Angola's Governor for the World Bank and African Development Bank and Member of the Government's Economic Cabinet. She was the Senior Advisor to Provincial Planning Cabinet, Benguela, Angola, Head of Investments Department, Ministry of Planning of Angola from 1986 – 1997 and the National Director of the Investment Department. Lourenco was the Vice Minister and Minister of Planning of Angola from 1997 to 2012. She served as the Vice Chairman of the Board's Ethics Committee and on the Human Resources Committee between 2014 and 2015. Lourenco served as an Executive Director at the Board of the World Bank Group. As the head of Ministry of Planning Investment, she was responsible for the development programs of Benguela Province. Between 1997 and 1999 she served as Planning deputy minister and was twice president of the Council of Ministers of SADC. As the Governor of Angola to the World Bank and national coordinator of EDF funds.

Lourenço has been in the Ministry of Planning since 1997, first as Deputy Minister of Planning from 1997 to 1999 and national Minister of Planning from 1999 to 2012. Since September 30, 2006, she has been the chairperson of the Southern African Development Community. Lourenço was the sixth candidate on the MPLA's national list in the September 2008 parliamentary election. She won a seat in the election.

Honours

Foreign Honours
:
  Dame Grand Cross of the Order of Civil Merit (31 January 2023)
:
  Dame Grand Cross of the Order of Prince Henry (22 November 2018)

References

External links
 Interview on World Investment News, 16 August 2004
 ANGOP 30 September 2006

1957 births
Living people
First ladies of Angola
Members of the National Assembly (Angola)
Economy ministers of Angola
Planning ministers of Angola
People from Luanda
20th-century women politicians
21st-century Angolan women politicians
21st-century Angolan politicians
Women government ministers of Angola
MPLA politicians